Dr. George A. Phillips (1853-October 9, 1921) was an American medical doctor and politician from Maine. Phillips, a Republican served one term in the Maine House of Representatives. While in office, he authored a law which prohibited people with syphilis from getting married without a certificate from a physician.

Born in Orland, Maine, Phillips graduated from Castine Normal School. He then earned an M.D. from the City University of New York (CUNY) in 1882. He was a United States Pension Examiner, served on the Bar Harbor, Maine School Board and as president of the Bar Harbor Board of Trade.

References

1853 births
1921 deaths
Physicians from Maine
People from Orland, Maine
People from Bar Harbor, Maine
City University of New York alumni
Republican Party members of the Maine House of Representatives
School board members in Maine